Northern Athabaskan is a geographic sub-grouping of the Athabaskan language family spoken by indigenous peoples in the northern part of North America, particularly in Alaska (Alaskan Athabaskans), Yukon, and the Northwest Territories. The Northern Athabaskan languages consist of 31 languages that can be divided into seven geographic subgroups.

Southern Alaskan

 1. Ahtna (also known as Atna, Ahtena, Copper River)
 Central Copper River Ahtna
 Lower Copper River Ahtna
 Mentasta (also known as Upper Ahtna)
 Western Ahtna
 2. Dena’ina (also known as Tanaina)
 Lower Inlet Dena’ina
 - Outer Inlet
 - Iliamna
 - Inland
 Upper Inlet Dena’ina

Central Alaska–Yukon

A. Koyukon
 3. Deg Xinag (also known as Deg Hit'an, Kaiyuhkhotana, Ingalik)
 Lower Yukon River
 Middle Kuskokwin
 4. Holikachuk (also known as Innoko, Innoka-khotana, Tlëgon-khotana)
 5. Koyukon (also known as Ten’a, Co-Youkon, Co-yukon)
 Lower Koyukon (also known as Lower Yukon Koyukon)
 Central Koyukon (also known as Dinaakkanaaga Ts’inh Huyoza, Koyukuk River Koyukon)
 Upper Koyukon (also known as Upper Yukon Koyukon)

B. Tanana–Tutchone
 6. Upper Kuskokwim (also known as Kolchan, Goltsan)
 I. Tanana
 7. Lower Tanana (also known as Tanana, Minto, Dandey in, Dineh su, Tananatana)
 Minto-Tolovana-Toklat-Nenana-Wood River
 - Minto-Tolovana
 - Toklat
 - Nenana
 - Wood River
 Chena
 Salcha-Goodpastor
 8. Tanacross (also known as Tanana, Dandey in, Dineh su, Tananatana)
 9. Upper Tanana (also known as Tanana, Dandey in, Dineh su, Tananatana)
 Nabesna
 Tetlin
 Northway
 Scottie Creek
 Canadian Upper Tanana
 II. Tutchone (also known as Gens de Bois, Gunana, Nahane, Nahani, Tutchonekutchin)
 10. Southern Tutchone (sometimes considered to be just a dialect)
 11. Northern Tutchone (also known as Mayo) (sometimes considered to be just a dialect)

C. Kutchin–Han
 12. Gwich’in (also known as Gwitch’in, Kutchin, Kootchin, Loucheux, Loucheaux, Takudh, Tukudh, "Quarrelers")
 Alaskan Gwich’in (also known as Western Gwich’in)
 Canadian Gwich’in (also known as Eastern Gwich’in)
 13. Hän (also known as Han, Moosehide, Dawson, Gens du Fou, Han Gwich-in, Han-Kootchin, Hankutchin)

Northwestern Canada

A. Cordillera
 I. Central Cordillera (also known as Tahltan-Tagish-Kaska)
 14. Tagish (also known as Gunana, Nahane, Nahani, Si-him-E-na, "Stick Indians", Tagisch, Tahgish, Tahkeesh, Tahk-heesh)
 15. Tahltan (also known as Nahanni, Keyehotine, Nahane, Nahani, Tahl-tan, Tatltan, Ticaxhanoten, Toltan)
 16. Kaska (also known as Nahanni, Nahane, Nahani, Cassiar)
 II. Southeastern Cordillera
 17. Sekani
 18. Danezaa (also known as Beaver, Tsattine, Dunne-za, Deneza, Gens de Castor)

B. Mackenzie
 I. Slavey–Hare (v Slave)
 19. Slavey (also known as Slavey proper, South Slavey, Southern Slavey, Dene Tha, Esclave, Nahane, Nahani, Slave)
 20. Mountain (also known as Montagnards, Nahane, Nahani, Sih gotine, Sihta gotine)
 21. Bearlake (also known as Satudine, Sahtu gotine, Bear Lake)
 22. Hare (also known as Kawchottine, Ka so gotine, Kancho, Kawchodinneh, Rabbitskins, Ta-na-tin-ne)
 23. Dogrib (also known as Tli Cho, Tłįchǫ or Thlingchadine)

C. Chipewyan
 24. Dene Suline (also known as Chipewyan, Dëne Sųłiné, Dene, Yellowknife, Montagnais, "Northern Indians", Copper Indians, Coppermine Indians, Mithcocoman, Red Knife, T’atsan ottine, Tatsotine, Yellow Knife)

Tsetsaut

 25. Tsetsaut (also known as Ts’ets’aut, Nahane, Nahani, Portland Canal, Wetalth)

Central British Columbia

 26. Babine-Witsuwit'en (also known as North Carrier, Babine Carrier, Northern Carrier, Bulkley Valley, Lakes District, Western Carrier)
 Babine (also known as Nadot’en, Nedut’en, Nat’oot’en)
 Takla
 Witsuwit’en (also known as Wetsuwet’en, Wets’uwet’en, Wet’suwet’en)
 Moricetown
 Francois Lake
 27. Dakelh (also known as Carrier, Dakelhne, Takelne, Takulli, Taculli, Takulie, Porteur, Nagailer)
 Central Carrier (also known as Upper Carrier)
 Southern Carrier (also known as Lower Carrier)
 28. Chilcotin (also known as Tsilhqot’in, Tinneh, Chilkhodins, Tsilkotin)
 29. Nicola (also known as Stuwix, Nicola-Similkameen) (extinct)

Sarsi

 30. Sarsi (also known as Sarcee, Tsuu T’ina, or Tsuut’ina)

Kwalhioqua–Tlatskanai

 31. Kwalhioqua-Clatskanie (also known as Kwalhioqua-Tlatskanie)
 Willapa (also known as Willoopah)
 Suwal-Clatskanie
 - Suwal
 - Clatskanie (also known as Tlatskanie)

References

Bibliography
 See: Athabaskan languages#Bibliography.

External links
 Map of Northern Athabaskan dialects

 
Indigenous languages of Alaska